The Avarayr Plain is the location of the Battle of Avarayr in 451, and is described as being along the banks of the Ṭłmut River (Rūd-e Zangemār, Iran), apparently the Armeno-Persian frontier at that time.  At the time, the Avarayr plain was part of the Armenian region of Vaspurakan.  The plain is located today in northwestern Iran close to the village of Chors near the border with Nakhchivan.

See also 
 Battle of Avarayr
 Vaspurakan

References 

Battlefields
Plains of Iran